Hingham may refer to:

In the United Kingdom
Hingham, Norfolk

In the United States
Hingham, Massachusetts, a New England town
Hingham (CDP), Massachusetts, the central urban area in the town
Hingham, Montana, a town
Hingham, Wisconsin, an unincorporated community